The men's 1500 metres event  at the 1987 IAAF World Indoor Championships was held at the Hoosier Dome in Indianapolis on 6 and 7 March.

Medalists

Results

Heats
The first 3 of each heat (Q) and next 3 fastest (q) qualified for the final.

Final

References

1500
1500 metres at the World Athletics Indoor Championships